Facundo Cabral (birth name Rodolfo Enrique Cabral Camiñas) (May 22, 1937 – July 9, 2011) was an Argentine singer, songwriter and philosopher.

He was best known as the composer of "No soy de aquí ni soy de allá" ("I'm not from here nor there"), "Pobrecito mi Patron" ("My Poor Boss"), and many other compositions. His songs have been covered by multiple Spanish language performers such as Jorge Cafrune, Alberto Cortez, Juan Luis Guerra, and Joan Manuel Serrat. Cabral protested military dictatorships in Latin America through activism and art from the 1970s onward, and his music combined mysticism, philosophy and spirituality with calls for social justice and equality.

After touring the world, Cabral enjoyed popularity in his home country during the early 1980s, when Argentine radio demanded local content after the Falklands War. He was popular throughout Latin America in his lifetime and still enjoys a sizeable posthumous legacy throughout the continent. For his advocacy for peace through his work, Facundo Cabral was named a UNESCO Messenger of Peace in 1996.

Biography
Facundo Cabral was born Rodolfo Enrique Cabral Camiñas in the Argentine city of La Plata, one of seven children to an impoverished and illiterate mother. His father abandoned the family shortly before Facundo was born, and they wouldn't meet until Facundo was 46 years old. The young Facundo was mute, unable to talk until the age of nine. He was illiterate until the age of 14. Facundo would later recount leaving his home early at nine years old to find work for himself and for his mother, dedicated to all kinds of tasks. Later in life, Cabral would often cite his mother's reaction to his departure as a child: she told him as he left: "This is the second, and last gift I can give you. The first was to give you life, and the second one, the freedom to live it." He would travel to Mar del Plata and work odd jobs. As a young adult, he got a job as a cleaner in a hotel. There, he would often play guitar and sing to pass time or make extra money. The hotel owner saw him with his guitar and gave him the opportunity to sing professionally.

In his early career he went by names such as El Indio Gasparino before settling on Facundo Cabral. He performed in over 165 countries, with his works translated into many languages. Due to his image as a rebel artist and protests against military power, he was exiled from Argentina after the 1976 military coup and subsequently spent time in Mexico and toured extensively before returning in the early 1980s.

Cabral was married twice. His first wife and their one-year-old daughter were killed in 1978 in the PSA Flight 182 crash near San Diego, California, which devastated him and would mark his life. His second wife, Silvia Pousa was married to him for seven months before his death in Guatemala. He was nearly blind and crippled at the time of his death, and was a bone cancer survivor as well, having nearly died from it decades before his death. He often talked of his dedication to traveling, calling himself a "first-class vagabond." He often mentioned that he preferred living a simple lifestyle, eschewing wealth and personal comfort for happiness and spiritual clarity, which were subjects in his work.

He gave his testimony of life to the world in songs, poems and in interviews. One of his noted quotations was, "I always ask God, why did you give me so much? You gave me misery, hunger, happiness, struggle, lights... I saw everything. I know there is cancer, syphilis and spring, and apple fritters."

Religious and political views 
Facundo expressed that his spiritual views were influenced by a variety of figures, including Jesus, Laozi, Zhuang Zhou, Rajneesh, Jiddu Krishnamurti, Gautama Buddha, Schopenhauer, John the Baptist, Francis of Assisi, Gandhi and Mother Teresa. He preached quantum mysticism and the subjugation of the ego.

He had admiration for the writings of Jorge Luis Borges (with whom he engaged in philosophical discussions) and of Walt Whitman.

It is generally thought that Cabral never adhered to a specific political movement, although for years he advocated pacifism as a way of resolving conflicts. He used to describe himself as "violently pacifist", and as a "first-class homeless person". During his later years he partly identified himself with the ideas of philosophical anarchism.

Murder
Cabral was shot and killed during a tour in Guatemala City while en route to La Aurora International Airport on July 9, 2011.

He had left a hotel in the west of Guatemala City, after giving a concert the previous evening in Quetzaltenango, and was headed to the airport when gunmen attacked his vehicle, a white Range Rover Sport, hitting him with at least eight bullets. He died in the car. The incident occurred at around 05.20 (local time) and took place on Liberation Boulevard, a busy road that connects with the airport, but at the time of the attack was practically empty. Cabral initially planned to take a hotel shuttle to the airport, but accepted a ride from Nicaraguan concert promoter/night club owner Henry Fariñas.

Cabral was with his agent David Llanos and Henry Fariñas, who were wounded. He was accompanied by a second vehicle carrying bodyguards, but they couldn't protect the singer's vehicle from the bullets. Cabral was riding in an SUV that tried to flee the attackers by driving into a fire station. At least 20 bullet holes were seen in the Range Rover car he was in. The gunmen were in three late-model vehicles, one in front of Cabral's car and two to the right and left. One of the attackers' vehicles was later found abandoned on the road to El Salvador. It was a brown Hyundai Santa Fe with bullet holes and containing bullet-proof vests and an AK-47 magazine. Early investigations indicated that the trajectory of the bullets were from right to left, toward the driver's seat, indicating that the bullets were meant for the driver, Cabral's Nicaraguan promoter Henry Fariñas, possibly because of troubles with organized crime. Three suspects were arrested.

Cabral, at the time of his murder, had been married for seven months to Silvia Pousa, a Venezuelan psychologist who had been his partner for the last ten years. His body was flown to Argentina from Guatemala on July 12, 2011, on a Mexican Air Force jet. His widow, Silvia Pousa, and nephew joined foreign minister Hector Timerman and a small group of Guatemalan and Mexican diplomats on the tarmac in Buenos Aires to receive his remains. One official brought from the plane a guitar and a small bag. Cabral had said that was all he needed for his nearly constant singing tours.

His coffin was displayed for the public in the Ateneo theater, the same Buenos Aires theater where he last performed in his native Argentina. The widow and family of Cabral gave a statement to reporters at the Ateneo theater, which expressed "thanks to the huge amount of media around the world by the respectful coverage" of his death.

On March 13, 2012, Colombian authorities announced the arrest of Alejandro Jiménez (a.k.a. El Palidejo), who is believed to have ordered Cabral's murder.

Responses
President Colom decreed three days of national mourning. Hundreds of Guatemalans (most of them wearing black) sang songs written by the artist in the capital's Plaza de la Constitucion. Some of the signs carried by Guatemalans grieving the death of the beloved singer said "Argentina, we apologize," "We ask forgiveness of the world for the assassination of Facundo;" "We are here not only for the death of Maestro Cabral, but also for every boy, girl, old man and woman, who becomes, day after day, victim of violence. Not only for Facundo Cabral, but also for the future of our children".

Presidents, performers and other personalities from the Americas united in condemning the singer's murder and demanding justice from the Guatemalan authorities. Guatemala's 1992 Nobel Peace Prize winner, Rigoberta Menchú, went to the scene of the killing and wept. "For me, Facundo Cabral is a master," she said. "He loved Guatemala greatly." She believes the ambush may have been related to Cabral's beliefs.

Social networks were filled with expressions of outrage. "I feel an immeasurable shame, a profound anger for my country", said Ronalth Ochaeta, former director of a Catholic church human rights office Guatemala, on his Facebook account. Rodolfo Ajquejay, President of the Association of Artists in Guatemala, said "this is mourning at a global level because [he] left only positive messages in his songs".

This incident "was regrettable" and was "one more manifestation of the violence in Guatemala," said Francisco Dall'Anese, the head of the International Commission Against Impunity in Guatemala (CICIG), an organization created in conjunction with the United Nations. Guatemala's human rights ombudsman, Sergio Morales, expressed his condolences to Argentina."I ask authorities of this country that this crime not be left unsolved, to investigate," he said.

Ecuadorian President Rafael Correa said "Facundo Cabral will be immortalized with his songs."

Bolivian authorities expressed their dismay at the death of the Argentine troubadour. Bolivian Minister of Culture Elizabeth Salguero said Cabral's death saddened her because "you can not understand that there are people who want to do much damage to a man who gave so much as a singer, composer, and poet." "He was a philosopher, a fighter for social justice, and to die that way is very painful."

Venezuelan President Hugo Chavez followed suit: "We are weeping with Argentina."

The Mayor of Lima, Peru and former presidential candidate, Susana Villaran, tweeted: "So ironic. A man who preached about peace and sang for life, dies in such a violent way" and shared one of his most famous quotes: "If you love the money at most you'll get to a bank, but if you love life, God will surely come."

The Colombian president, Juan Manuel Santos, also mourned his death. "Many of you must be fans of Facundo Cabral, and throughout Latin America and us here in Colombia. I personally regret this vile murder," Santos said at the start of a public speech in Bogotá.

The United Nations said in a statement: "The United Nations System in Guatemala strongly condemns the assassination of Argentine singer-songwriter Facundo Cabral and adds to the feeling of dismay and frustration of a Guatemalan society that looks beset by intolerable acts of violence. It is painfully ironic that the one who toured Latin America with a message of justice, peace and fraternity lost his life in the hands of a group of assassins. The UN expresses its solidarity with the families and loved ones of the troubadour, as well as the people of Argentina and Latin American that had Facundo as a reference for inspiration."

Eduardo Suger, the presidential candidate for the "Commitment, Renewal and Order" party, during his tour in San Manuel Chaparron and San Luis Jilotepeque, Jalapa, described as "vile and shameful" for the country the attack to Cabral. "I felt so much pain, I felt sad for Guatemala, because we are a people capable and honest, but now we paint as a people of thugs, it's embarrassing," he explained.

The secretary general of the Organization of American States (OAS), Jose Miguel Insulza, condemned the murder as an "irrational crime."

René Pérez, leader of the Puerto Rican hip-hop group Calle 13, wrote, "Latin America is in mourning," and other leading pop-music figures, among them Ricky Martin, Alejandro Sanz and Ricardo Montaner, also sent Twitter messages lamenting his loss.

Guatemalan artists paid tribute to Facundo Cabral on Sunday, July 10, 2011. The Guatemalan artist guild called on all citizens to go Constitution Square to pay tribute to him. Armando Pineda, Alvaro Aguilar Alux Nahual and Rony Hernandez, Alejandro Arriaza, Gaby Andrade, and Manuel Rony were some of the artists who participated in this concert. In a letter to the Guatemalan newspaper Prensa Libre the singer Ricardo Arjona wrote: "As a Guatemalan, I deeply regret the impact this news will generate among international opinion. As a friend and colleague, I will lament the absence of Facundo forever."

Vicente Serrano, host of a local Spanish-language radio show, brought Cabral to the Chicago area for that last performance. Serrano, who described Cabral as "irreverent," remembers how the singer fell in love with the Chicago skyline and the Art Institute of Chicago. "Facundo cried when we went to visit the Art Institute because he said he was moved by its beauty," Serrano said

Argentine singer and poet Alberto Cortez, who lives in Madrid, was devastated by the assassination of Cabral, who shared a "great friendship" with Cabral.
"I remember him as a good friend, who suddenly became a mystic. That mysticism transmitted to people, and people accepted it with much pleasure,"he said.

Argentine television stations interrupted their broadcasts with news of the 74-year-old singer's death. The National Government decreed three days of mourning for the death of Cabral. Recalling that he "devoted his life to singing, with their letters transmitting the spirit of peace inspired by the teachings of Jesus, Gandhi and Mother Teresa of Calcutta."

Other quotes

"Every morning is good news, every child that is born is good news, every just man is good news, every singer is good news, because every singer is one less soldier."
"I like the sun, Alice, and doves, a good cigar, a Spanish guitar, jumping walls, and opening windows, and when a woman cries. I like wine as much as flowers, and rabbits, but not tractors, homemade bread and Dolores' voice, and the sea wetting my feet. I like to always be lying on the sand, or chasing Manuela on a bicycle, or all the time to see the stars with Maria in the hayfield. I'm not from here, I'm not from there, I have no age, nor future, and being happy is my color of identity."
"I'm amazed to form part of this amazing universe and I'm proud of the hunger that keeps me awake. Because when man is full he falls asleep."
"May God want for man to be able to be a child again to understand that he is mistaken if he thinks he can find happiness with a checkbook."
"I don't waste time taking care of myself. Life is beautiful danger. From the danger of love, my mother had seven kids. If she had guarded herself against my father and his fervor, a singer would be missing from tonight's meeting."
"My poor boss thinks that I'm the poor one."
"This is a new day to begin again, to look for the angel that appears in our dreams, to sing, to laugh, to be happy again. In this new day I will leave the mirror, and try to finally be a good man. I will walk with my face to the sun, and I will fly with the moon."
"Forgive me Lord but sometimes I get tired of being a citizen. The city tires me, the offices, my family and the economy. Forgive me Lord, I am tired of this hell, this mediocre market where everyone has a price. Forgive me Lord but I will go with you through your mountains, your seas, and your rivers. Forgive me Lord but sometimes I think you have something better than this for me. Forgive me Lord, I don't want to be a citizen, I want to be a man, Lord, like you created me."
"I am my own inventor because that is the task with which God has trusted me. God, or the Devil because they are the same thing. The Devil is a pseudonym that God uses when he has to create something of morally doubtful character, in order to not tarnish his good name, he uses the pseudonym."
"The poor man that walks through this borrowed life without a song, in addition to being poor is a ghost, and in addition to being a ghost, is nothing."
"We are crossing through life on the train of death seeing how progress is putting an end to people."
"And God created woman and she said 'My Lord, if Mary conceived without sin, couldn't I sin without conceiving?'"
"I stop in San Francisco where there's always something to hear, at least when Krishnamurti is nearby, he who knows that the fundamental revolution is to revolutionize one's self. I stop in Crete where there is always something to love."
I raise my voice in Italy and I am silent in India, because I am and I live in the present, because I am made of dreams, of emptiness, of wine, and of wheat, they call me MAN. It's true that I am dust, but sacred dust I am, even though you know that when I say I am, I am saying you are, invincible, unnameable. Highest Lord, don't worry about our daily bread because that is up to us, that's why we are men, but don't leave us without our nightly dream because without it we are nothing, we who are perhaps only a dream that you dream."
"If I am a thief, it's because of private property."
"God has given you a human being to be in charge for, and this is yourself."

References

1937 births
2011 deaths
Argentine activists
20th-century Argentine male singers
Argentine philosophers
Argentine male singer-songwriters
Folk rock musicians
People from La Plata
People from Tandil
Illustrious Citizens of Buenos Aires
Deaths by firearm in Guatemala
Argentine murder victims
Argentine people murdered abroad
People murdered in Guatemala
Male songwriters
Argentine singer-songwriters